was a Japanese engineer and a pioneer in the development of television. Although he failed to gain much recognition in the West, he built the world's first all-electronic television receiver, and is referred to as "the father of Japanese television".

Career

In 1925, Takayanagi began research on television after reading about the new technology in a French magazine. He developed a system similar to that of John Logie Baird, using a Nipkow disk to scan the subject and generate electrical signals. But unlike Baird, Takayanagi took the important step of using a cathode ray tube to display the received signal, thereby developing the first "all-electronic" television set. On December 25, 1926, Takayanagi successfully demonstrated his system at Hamamatsu Industrial High School, where he was teaching at the time (the school is now the Faculty of Engineering at Shizuoka University). The first picture he transmitted was of the Japanese katakana character  made up of 40 scan lines. This was several months before Philo T. Farnsworth demonstrated his first fully electronic system in San Francisco on September 7, 1927, which did not require a Nipkow disk. (See History of television.)

In subsequent years, Takayanagi continued to play a key role in the development of television at NHK (the Japan Broadcasting Corporation) and then at JVC (Victor Company of Japan), where he eventually became vice president. He was also involved in the development of color television and video tape recorders. He died of pneumonia in 1990 at the age of 91.

Honours
From the corresponding article in the Japanese Wikipedia

Medal of Honour with Purple Ribbon - 29 April 1955
Person of Cultural Merit - 3 November 1980
Order of Culture - 3 November 1981
Grand Cordon of the Order of the Sacred Treasure - 29 April 1989  (Second Class, Gold and Silver Star: 3 November 1974)
Work on development of television named an IEEE Milestone in 2009.

References

External links
Kenjiro Takayanagi: The Father of Japanese Television - A tribute to Kenjiro Takayanagi at the NHK website

1899 births
1990 deaths
Japanese electrical engineers
Television pioneers
Television in Japan
People from Hamamatsu
Recipients of the Order of Culture
20th-century Japanese engineers